Pine Hills is a sparsely populated hilly region located in Plymouth, Massachusetts, in the United States. It is a large, mostly undeveloped hilly and forested area lying south of Plymouth Beach and Chiltonville, north of Manomet, and east of Route 3, where the southern portion of the region can be accessed from Exit 3 (which is signed as of 1 October 2007), and the northern portion can be accessed from Exit 4. The area rises from Plymouth Bay at Rocky Point, which is considered to be located in the foothills of the region, and runs southwest. Route 3A winds through the heart of the Pine Hills. The region consists of the Rocky Point neighborhood in the north and The Pinehills, a new residential and commercial development in the extreme southern part of the area.

Manomet Hill
Manomet Hill is the highest peak in the Pine Hills . Route 3A runs close to the peak. As the peak is on private property, it is closed to the public.

Cleft Rock
Cleft Rock is a rock formation located in the Pine Hills, known for the unique cleft that runs through its center. The rock formation is said to have been used as a lookout spot by the Native Americans, and it offers a panoramic view of Cape Cod Bay on a clear day.
It is located in an  park on Route 3A.

See also
 Plymouth, Massachusetts
 Neighborhoods in Plymouth, Massachusetts

External links
 Massachusetts County Trip Reports
 Town of Plymouth Parks, Playgrounds and Beaches

Plymouth, Massachusetts
Neighborhoods in Plymouth, Massachusetts
Geography of Plymouth County, Massachusetts